Dorud Rural District is a rural district (dehestan) in the Central District of Dorud County, Lorestan Province, Iran. At the 2006 census, its population was 13,689, in 2,834 families.  The rural district has 32 villages.

References 

Rural Districts of Lorestan Province
Dorud County